Edward Mundy (April 14, 1794 – May 13, 1851) was an American politician and judge from the U.S. state of Michigan, and served as its first lieutenant governor.

Early life
Mundy was born in Middlesex County, New Jersey, and graduated from Rutgers College in 1812. In later years was for one of the appointed Regents of the University. He was admitted to the bar and began a practice in New Jersey. and was for several years one of the appointed Regents of the University.

Career
In about 1819, Mundy moved to Illinois and remained there several years, until the losses he experienced due to a fire caused him to return to New Jersey, where he continued for some years in other business pursuits. In 1831, he moved with his family to Ann Arbor, Michigan. He was appointed Justice of the Peace by the Territorial Governor and was subsequently made a Judge of one of the Territorial Courts.  In 1835, he was a delegate from the 4th district to the first State Constitutional Convention to prepare for the admission of the State to the Union.

Mundy was nominated to the office of Lieutenant Governor on the ticket with Governor Stevens T. Mason.  They both won the general election, and he served as Michigan's first Lieutenant Governor, from 1835 to 1840.

Appointed by Governor William L. Greenly and the Michigan Senate to the office of Prosecuting Attorney, Mundy went on that year to serve as Michigan Attorney General. In 1848, the Michigan Supreme Court was expanded to include a fifth justice and a new judicial circuit, which were presided over by Supreme Court judges. Mundy was appointed the Supreme Court and to the new circuit and was a justice of the Michigan Supreme Court until his death.

Death
Mundy died while in office, in Grand Rapids, Kent County, Michigan, on May 13, 1851 (age 57 years, 29 days). The place of his interment is in Fulton Street Cemetery.

Family life
The son of Samuel and Abigail Mundy, he married Sarah Mundy, daughter of Phinehas Mundy, on November 11, 1816. They had five children, Phinehas, Abby Rowland, Elizabeth Lennington, Julia Thompson, and James Edward.

References

External links
 Michigan Supreme Court Historical Society

1794 births
1851 deaths
People from Middlesex County, New Jersey
Lieutenant Governors of Michigan
Michigan Attorneys General
Justices of the Michigan Supreme Court
Rutgers University alumni
Burials in Michigan
Delegates to the 1835 Michigan Constitutional Convention
Regents of the University of Michigan
19th-century American politicians
19th-century American judges